Pennsylvania State Senate District 48 includes parts of Berks County and Lancaster County and all of Lebanon County. It is currently represented by Republican Chris Gebhard.

District profile
The district includes the following areas:

Berks County:

Lancaster County:

All of Lebanon County

Senators

References

Pennsylvania Senate districts
Government of Dauphin County, Pennsylvania
Government of Lebanon County, Pennsylvania
Government of York County, Pennsylvania